The following is the organization of the Confederate forces engaged at the Siege of Port Hudson, during the American Civil War in 1863. The Union order of battle is listed separately.

Abbreviations used

Military rank
 MG = Major General
 BG = Brigadier General
 Col = Colonel
 Ltc = Lieutenant Colonel
 Maj = Major
 Cpt = Captain
 Lt = 1st Lieutenant
 Sgt Maj = Sergeant Major

Department of Mississippi & East Louisiana

See also

 Louisiana in the American Civil War

Notes

References
 Port Hudson, Louisiana
 Eicher, John H., and Eicher, David J., Civil War High Commands, Stanford University Press, 2001, 

American Civil War orders of battle